Nirmal Baby Varghese is an Indian film director  in Malayalam. He is known for his historical documentary film Thariode. His feature directorial debut Vazhiye, was an experimental movie made in found footage style and it is the first found footage movie in Malayalam. He is also script writer,  film editor, and public relations officer.  He is the younger brother of film producer Baby Chaithanya. 
He runs his own independent film production company called Casablanca Film Factory.

Early life
Nirmal was born to Baby P K and Lilly Baby on 13 January 1994 at Kavummannam, in Wayanad district, in Kerala.

Film career
In 2016, Nirmal directed two short films,Mirror of Reality and Mattam the Change, which were later released on Amazon Prime Video on 2020.

He began his career in Malayalam film industry in 2017 as the associate editor of the film Kalippu, starring Bala Singh, Kalasala Babu, Ambika Mohan and Shalil Kallur. Later he worked as a poster designer for the film Freakens, starring Biju Sopanam, Indrans and Kalabhavan Navas. He has also worked as a public relations officer for the films Moppala, Deira Diaries, Sarcas Circa 2020, and Vijay Yesudas's multilingual 3D film Salmon 3D.

He made his third directorial venture in Thariode, a historical documentary film about gold mining in Thariode. The film found critical acclaim in the festival circuit. He also announced a fictionalization of Thariode. He later announced the title of this cinematic remake as Thariode: The Lost City with a mainly foreign cast list including Bill Hutchens, Luing Andrews, Alexx O'Nell, Courtney Sanello, Amelie Leroy, Brendan Byrne and Roger Ward.

His feature directorial debut film Vazhiye is the first found footage movie in the Malayalam language. The film marked the debut of Hollywood music director Evan Evans in Indian cinema.

Filmography

Awards and accolades

Awards and nominations

Film festival official selections

References

External links
 
 
 
 

21st-century Indian film directors
Film directors from Kerala
Malayalam film directors
Indian male screenwriters
Malayalam screenwriters
Screenwriters from Kerala
Indian documentary film directors
1994 births
Living people
People from Wayanad district